Ivan Lednei (4 November 1959) is a former professional Soviet football midfielder and coach.

References

External links
 

1959 births
Living people
Soviet footballers
SKA Kiev players
MFC Mykolaiv players
FC Metalist Kharkiv players
SC Tavriya Simferopol players
FC Olympik Kharkiv players
FC Hoverla Uzhhorod players
FC Torpedo Zaporizhzhia players
Soviet Top League players
Ukrainian football managers
FC Hoverla Uzhhorod managers
Association football midfielders
Sportspeople from Zakarpattia Oblast